Benjamin Howard may refer to:

 Benjamin Howard (Missouri politician) (1760–1814), American congressman from Kentucky and first governor of Missouri Territory
 Benjamin Chew Howard (1791–1872), American congressman from Maryland and fifth reporter of decisions of the United States Supreme Court

See also

 Ben Howard (disambiguation)
 Benjamin Howard Baker, English athlete